Don–Volga Portage (Russian: Волгодонская переволока, Volgodonskaya Perevoloka) refers to the ancient trade and military route located on the shortest distance (ca. 70 kilometers) between the major rivers Volga and Don, in today's Volgograd Oblast. The portage, where cargo and ships would be drawn over land either manually or by horse-drawn vehicles, was in use from the 1st millennium BCE to 1952 CE, when the Volga-Don Canal was opened.

Maps

Portages
Trade routes
Canals in Russia